Schering may refer to 
Schering (surname)
Schering Bridge, an electrical circuit
Schering AG, a German pharmaceutical company
Schering-Plough, an American pharmaceutical company
Hoechst Schering AgrEvo GmbH, a German company owned by Hoechst AG and Schering AG
Ernst Schering Prize for outstanding basic research in medicine, biology or chemistry
Medical News Schering, a medical journal published from 1929 to 1980